Avril is used as a given name and a surname. Measured by absolute frequency, it most often occurs in the United Kingdom, South Africa, and the United States.

Notable people with the name include:

Given name
Avril Anderson (born 1953), English music educator and composer
Avril Angers (1918–2005), English comedian
Avril Benoît, Canadian broadcaster
Avril Bowring (born 1942), English sprinter
Kim Campbell (born 1947), Avril "Kim" Campbell, Canada's first female Prime Minister
Avril Coleridge-Taylor (1903–1998), English pianist, conductor, and composer
Avril Dankworth (1922–2013), English music educator
Avril de Sainte-Croix (1855–1939), French author, journalist, feminist, and pacifist
Avril Doyle (born 1949), Irish politician
Avril Elgar (1932–2021), English stage-, radio-, and television actress
Avril Fahey (born 1974), Australian cricketer
Avril (Frédéric Magnon) (born 1974), French electro-ambient musician
Avril Haines (born 1969), American lawyer, first female Director of National Intelligence
Avril Henry (1935–2016), English activist
Avril Hoare, Irish radio personality
Avril Joy, British author
Avril Lavigne (born 1984), Canadian singer-songwriter
Avril Lennox (born 1956), British gymnast
Avril Lovelace-Johnson, Ghanaian jurist
Avril Malan (born 1937), South African rugby union player
Avril Palmer-Baunack (born 1964), British businesswoman
Avril Phali (born 1978), South African football player
Avril Pyman (born 1930), British scholar and Russian literature translator
Avril (singer) (born 1986), Kenyan singer-songwriter, actress, and entertainer
Avril Starling (born 1953), English cricketer
Avril Walker (born 1954), British luger
Avril Williams (born 1961), South African rugby player

Surname
Cliff Avril (born 1986), American football player
Édouard-Henri Avril or his pseudonym Paul Avril (1849–1928), French painter
Étienne Avril (1748–1791), French furniture designer
Jacky Avril (born 1964), French slalom canoer
Jane Avril (1868–1943), French dancer
Margaux Avril (born 1991), French singer
Philippe Avril (1654–1698?), French explorer
Prosper Avril (born 1937), Haitian politician
Yola d'Avril (1906–1984), American actress

Fictional characters
 Avril Hodgkins, a character from the educational TV series How We Used to Live
Avril Kent, character on Emmerdale
Avril Incandenza, mother of protagonist Hal Incandenza in the novel Infinite Jest by David Foster Wallace

See also

 
 Abril
April (given name)
April (surname)
Averell
Averill (disambiguation)
Avril (disambiguation)

References